At the 1896 Summer Olympics, five sport shooting events were contested.  These events took place at the newly constructed shooting range at Kallithea. They were organized and prepared by the Sub-Committee for Shooting. Sixty-one shooters from seven nations competed.

Medal summary
These medals are retroactively assigned by the International Olympic Committee; at the time, winners were given a silver medal and subsequent places received no award.

Participating nations
A total of 61 shooters from 7 nations competed at the Athens Games:

Medal table

Sub-Committee for Shooting
 HRH Prince Nicholas of Greece, president
 Ioannis Phrangoudis, secretary
 Demosthenes Staikos
 Alc. Krassas
 Joan. Konstantinides
 Alex. Kondostavlos
 Ath. Botzaris
 Ath. Pierrakos
 Georges Antonopoulos
 Stephen Skouloudis

See also
List of Olympic medalists in shooting

References
  (Digitally available at )
  (Excerpt available at )
 

 
1896 Summer Olympics events
1896
Olympics
Shooting competitions in Greece